Roger Shah (born 29 November 1972), also known as DJ Shah and Sunlounger, is a German electronic music composer and producer.

Biography

History 

Roger Shah was born in Esslingen in West Germany to a German mother and a Pakistani father. His brother Pedro del Mar (real name Patrick Shah), also a trance DJ, hosts a bi-weekly vocal trance show called Mellomania. Roger first began to hit his production stride in his native country in 1999 putting out the tracks "Claps", "The Mission" and "Tides of Time". In 2003 his "High" release was signed by Virgin Records imprint Nebula. This marked his first non-domestic release, and over the course of the next 5 years he inked productions to a range of trance labels such as Black Hole Recordings, Anjunadeep and Vandit.

Roger Shah has featured in DJ Mag Top 100 list 5 times, peaking at #21. He received a double EMPO nomination for Best Trance & Progressive DJ and Best Radio Show and an IDMA award nomination as break through artist in 2008.

As a producer he has worked with and produced for artists such as Tiësto, Armin van Buuren, Paul van Dyk, Sarah McLachlan, Kosheen,  Bryan Adams or Moya Brennan.

The Armin Connection 

In 2007 Armin van Buuren named Shah's "Who Will Find Me" release as his favourite track of 2007. Having heard the demo of its follow-up, van Buuren saw crossover potential in the track and made contact in early 2008 to ask if Shah would like to collaborate on it. The result was the Chris Jones song "Going Wrong" which reached number 5 in The Netherlands, the track went on to become one of the biggest selling trance singles of the year. From there Magic Island Records – Shah's primary label moved from his own stable to that of one of Armin's Armada Music.

Solo albums 

Songbook released in 2008. Singles taken from it like "Don't Wake Me Up" and the aforementioned "Going Wrong" & "Who Will Find Me". This was followed up by another solo album Openminded in 2011. Again, this featured 2 CDs, one of club mixes and one of album mixes.

Live and DJ performances 

In late 2008 Shah took the decision to change his artist name. Dropping the 'DJ' prefix, he revised it to Roger Shah – a move that signalled a move away from straightforward DJ sets. During live performance, Roger Shah frequently uses a wireless keyboard interface such as the M-Audio Oxygen 25 (25 key USB midi controller). Roger Shah has mentioned numerous times that he will perform with his laptop instead of CDs.

Pseudonyms and side projects 

In addition to his own name Roger has also produced under various other aliases. Notable among them are his 'pka' DJ Shah, High Noon at Salinas, Magic Island and Savannah. Shah is also one half of the Anjunabeats released act Purple Moods, Black Hole project Global Experience and ASOT's Black Pearl, whose '06 – '09 spanning singles 'Coral Sea', 'Java', 'Bounty Island' and 'Rise' generated much additional interest in Shah's solo productions.

Sunlounger 

This project included the release of the 'Another Day On The Terrace' album in 2008 which reached No.1 on Dutch iTunes' 'all-music-genres' chart and spawned four singles: 'In & Out', 'Aguas Blancas', 'Crawling' & 'White Sand'. The project became so celebrated that Roger expanded Sunlounger into a live act - a performance of which was featured on Armada's ArminOnly DVD. It was this experience that he credited with his latter wholesale move into live Roger Shah performances. In 2009 Roger released the Sunlounger follow-up LP 'Sunny Tales'. Its progeny singles included 'Catwalk', 'Mediterranean Flower', 'Change Your Mind' and the much-revered 'Lost' - voted as Tune of the Year for the 2008 A State of Trance radio show hosted by Armin van Buuren and numerous #1 airplay positions across the globe. His third album, The Beach Side of Life, was released in 2010.

Magic Island: Music For Balearic People – The Compilations 

Shah's compilation series has so far seen ten outings (2008, 2009, 2010, 2012, 2014, 2015, 2016, 2017, 2019, 2021).

Remixes 

Shah has reworked tracks for vocalists like Sarah McLachlan and Nadia Ali. He's also remixed tunes for Tiësto, Armin van Buuren, Mark Norman, York, Cosmic Gate, Josh Gabriel, Johan Gielen, System F, The Thrillseekers, Solarstone, Three Drives, Matt Darey and OceanLab. Most recently Roger has rewired Andain's "Beautiful Things '10" and Richard Durand's "Always The Sun".

Discography

DJ/Roger Shah

Albums
2000 Dj Shah - The Album
2008 Songbook
2011 Openminded!?
2016 Music For Meditation Yoga & Any Other Wellbeing Moments
2016 Singularity (with Nick Murray)
2018 No Boundaries
2020 Guardian of Dreams

Singles
1999 Claps 
1999 Commandments 
2000 Riddim 
2001 Tides of Time (feat. No Iron) 
2002 High 
2003 Sunday Morning 
2004 Sunset Road (with York)
2006 Beautiful (Glimpse Of Heaven) (feat. Jan Johnston) 
2007 Palmarosa 
2007 Who Will Find Me (feat. Adrina Thorpe)
2008 Going Wrong (with Armin van Buuren feat. Chris Jones) 
2008 Don't Wake Me Up (feat. Inger Hansen) 
2008 Back to You (feat. Adrina Thorpe)
2009 You're So Cool (with Tenishia feat. Lorilee) 
2009 To the Sky (with Chris Jones as Open Minded)
2009 I'm Not God (with Tenishia feat. Lorilee)  
2009 Healesville Sanctuary (feat. Signum)
2010 Hold On (with Judge Jules feat. Amanda Angelic)
2010 Catch a Cloud (with Tenishia feat. Lorilee) 
2010 Ancient World (with Signum)
2010 Over & Over 2010 / Guaba Beach
2011 Morning Star (feat. Moya Brennan)
2012 Hide U (feat. Sian Evans)
2012 Shine (feat. Sian Evans)
2012 Perfect Love (with Fila feat. Adrina Thorpe)
2012 Dance With Me (feat. Inger Hansen) 
2012 One Love (feat. Carla Werner) 
2012 Island (feat. Adrina Thorpe) 
2013 Higher than the Sun (feat. JES & Brian Laruso) 
2014 One Life (feat. DJ Feel and Zara) 
2014 No Brainer  
2014 Hope (with Nicholas Eli) 
2014 Without You (with Sied van Riel feat. Jennifer Rene) 
2014 The Namib (with Pierre Pienaar) 
2014 Eye 2 Eye (with Aly & Fila feat. Sylvia Tosun) <(#FSOE350 Anthem)> 
2015 Louder (with Paul Van Dyk & Roger Shah feat. Daphne Khoo) 
2015 Never Forget (with Nathia Kate feat. Amber) 
2016 Love Heals You (with Leilani) 
2016 Reasons to Live (with Moya Brennan) 
2016 Unbreakable (with Aly & Fila feat. Susana) 
2016 Fire (with Antillas and Zara Taylor) 
2017 Castles in the Sky (with Inger Hansen) 
2017 Eternal Time (feat. Leilani) 
2017 Call Me Home (with Aisling Jarvis) 
2018 Skyarium (with Taucher) 
2018 Star-crossed (with JES) 
2018 For the One You Love (with Ram feat. Natalie Gioia) 
2018 Hold Your Head Up High (with Aisling Jarvis) 
2018 A Different Part of Me (with Susie Ledge) 
2018 Ocean Flame (feat. Kristina Sky) 
2018 Without You (with DJ Shog) 
2019 Essence of Life (with Leilani) 
2019 When You're Here (with Aisling Jarvis) 
2019 Triumvirate (with Stoneface & Terminal) 
2019 Beautiful Lie (with Yoav) 
2019 Natural Order (with Rene Ablaze) 
2019 Save the World (with Natalie Gioia) 
2019 Controverse (with Stoneface & Terminal) 
2019 Patong Beach (with George Jema) 
2019 Epoch (with Pierre Pienaar and Dirkie Coetzee) 
2020 Malam (with Dennis Shepherd and Richard Durand) 
2020 Take Me Back (with Kristina Sky featuring Emma Shaffer)

Compilations
2005 The Ultimate Chillout Collection
2008 Sunlounger Sessions
2008 Magic Island: Music For Balearic People
2009 Magic Island: Music For Balearic People Vol. 2
2010 Magic Island: Music For Balearic People Vol. 3
2010 Sunlounger – The Downtempo Edition 
2012 Magic Island: Music For Balearic People Vol. 4
2014 Magic Island: Music For Balearic People Vol. 5 
2015 Global Experience with Brian Laruso and Roger Shah 
2015 Magic Island: Music For Balearic People Vol. 6 
2016 Magic Island: Music For Balearic People Vol. 7 
2017 Magic Island: Music For Balearic People Vol. 8

Remixes

as DJ Shah
2008 'Nadia Ali' - Crash and Burn

as Roger Shah
2008 'Sunlounger & Cap Feat. Stephanie Asscher' - Heart Of The Sun 
2009 'Richard Durand' - Always The Sun 
2009 'Roger Shah & Tenishia' - You're So Cool 
2009 'Roger Shah & Tenishia' - I'm Not God 
2009 'Roger Shah & Signum' - Healesville Sanctuary 
2009 'Ira Losco' - Shoulders Of Giants 
2009 'Samara' - Verano 
2010 'Andain' - Beautiful Things 
2010 'Roger Shah & Signum' - Ancient World 
2020 'Sunlounger' - White Sand (Roger Shah Uplifting Remix)

Sunlounger

Albums
2007 Another Day on the Terrace 
2008 Sunny Tales 
2010 The Beach Side of Life 
2013 Balearic Beauty 
2016 Balearic Beauty (Deluxe Edition)
2021 Sunsets & Bonfires

Singles
2006 White Sand 
2007 Aguas Blancas 
2007 In & Out 
2008 Crawling 
2008 Catwalk / Mediterranean Flower
2008 Lost (feat. Zara)
2009 Change Your Mind (feat. Kyler England)
2010 Found (feat. Zara)
2010 Breaking Waves (feat. Inger Hansen)
2010 Beautiful Night (feat. Antonio Lucas)
2012 Try To Be Love (feat. Zara)
2013 Finca (feat. Rocking J)
2013 Balearic Beauty 
2013 I'll Be Fine (feat. Alexandra Badoi) 
2014 Surrender (feat. Chase) 
2014 Glitter and Gold (feat. JES) 
2015 Sunkissed

Compilations
2014 Armada Collected: Sunlounger

Black Pearl

Singles
2006 Bounty Island 
2008 Coral Sea 
2009 Java 
2010 Rise 
2010 Discovery 
2015 Tagula Island

Savannah

Singles
2006 Savannah La Mar 
2009 Body Lotion 
2010 Darling Harbour

Global Experience

Albums
2015 Global Experience

Singles
2005 Tennessee / Dakar 
2006 Zanzibar / San Salvador 
2007 Madras / Malaysia 
2008 Koengen 
2011 New Life 
2014 Turtle Bay

Remixes
2006 'Brian Laruso' - Song For The Ocean 
2006 'Mark Norman Presents Celine' - Colour My Eyes 
2006 'Tiësto feat. Maxi Jazz' - Dance4Life 
2006 'North Dakota' - Superstring 2.6 
2007 'Shane 54' - 1000 Lullabies 
2007 'Johan Gielen' - Revelations -Right From My Heart- 
2008 'High Noon at Salinas' - Celebration 
2008 'Charles McThorn Feat. Elles De Graaf' - Winds Will Turn

High Noon at Salinas

Albums
2017 Beach Grooves, Vol. 1

References

External links
 TranceSound interview, November 2010
 Trance Hub interview: September, 2007

German electronic musicians
German DJs
Living people
Club DJs
German dance musicians
Remixers
Ableton Live users
German trance musicians
German people of Pakistani descent
Armada Music artists
Chill-out musicians
1972 births
Balearic music
Electronic dance music DJs